Daniel and Luis Moncada are Honduran-American actors and brothers known for their role as "The Cousins" Leonel and Marco Salamanca on the AMC crime drama series Breaking Bad (2010) and its spin-off Better Call Saul (2016; 2018–2022). Despite portraying twins in the series, in real life Luis is around three years older than Daniel.

Luis Moncada was formerly in a gang and had served a prison sentence for vehicle theft.

Filmography

Daniel's roles

Justified (2014) - Manolo
Sabotage (2014) - Brujo's Sicario #5
McFarland, USA (2015) - Eddie
Blood Father (2016) - Choop
Bright (2017) - Shadow (uncredited)
The Mule (2018) - Eduardo
Dead End (2019) - Little Sleepy

Luis' roles
Latin Dragon (2004) - Gangster
Collateral (2004) - Cold Eyed Killer
El Padrino (2004) - Bodyguard (uncredited)
Yard Sale (2004) - Gang Member #2
Hitting the Bricks (2008) - Rudy
Days of Wrath (2008) - Oso
Fast & Furious (2009) - Scar Thug
Down for Life (2009) - Oso
Dexter (2011) - Julio Benes
K-11 (2012) - ShyBoy
Sabotage (2014) - Brujo's Sicario #2
Brooklyn Nine-Nine (2014) - Tito Ruiz
Street Level (2015) - Tommy
So B. It (2016) - Zander's Dad
This Is Now (2016) - Johnny
The Night Is Young (2017) - Luis
Bright (2017) - Casper
Get Shorty (TV series) (2019) - Queso

References

External links
 
 

1981 births
1983 births
Living people
Honduran male actors
Gang members
Brother duos